Albert Cooper may refer to:

Sports
Albert Cooper (cricketer) (1893–1977), English cricketer
Albert Cooper (soccer) (1904–1993), U.S. soccer player
Bertie Cooper (1892–1916), Australian rules footballer
Bert Cooper (born 1966), American heavyweight boxer
Albert Cooper (horse trainer), trainer of Burlington, the winning horse of the 1890 Belmont Stakes

Other
Albert Cooper (British politician) (1910–1986), British politician
Albert Cooper (Canadian politician) (born 1952), Canadian politician
Albert Cooper (flute maker), British flute maker

See also
Bert Cooper (disambiguation)